Lobogenesis antiqua is a species of moth of the family Tortricidae. It is found in Bolivia.

The length of the forewings is 7.8 mm. The forewings are dingy white with pale tan-yellow overscaling. The hindwings are whitish with pale greyish mottling.

Etymology
The species name refers to the fact that the type specimen was collected more than 100 years before it was formally described. It is derived from the word antique.

References

Moths described in 2000
Euliini